Shizhu Tujia Autonomous County, or Shizhu County for short, is located in southeastern Chongqing, China. It is south of the Yangtze River, and borders the Chongqing divisions of Pengshui County to the south, Fengdu County to the southwest, Zhong County to the northwest and Wanzhou District to the north; to the east, it borders the Hubei county-level city of Lichuan. It's in the center zone of Three Gorges Reservoir Region, and the only autonomous county which designated for only one of ethnic minorities in this region. (Chongqing Municipality has four counties that designated for ethnic minorities but because the other three counties are designated for more than one of ethnic minorities, this autonomous county is only one which is designated for only one of ethnic minorities)

Name

Shizhu literally means "Stone Pillars", which is named after two big human-like natural stone pillars standing on Wanshou Mountain. The two stone pillars were once a loving couple in a native "Romeo and Juliet" style love story. To fight against feudal oppression of free love, they died together tragically, and turned into two stone pillars standing face-to-face on Wanshou Mountain, never to be apart again.

Geography

Area: 

Population: 510,000

County seat: Nanbin Town()

Geographic coordinates: 29°39′-30°32′ North, 107°59′-108°34′, East

By the end of 1992, the population of Shizhu County had increased up to 462,100, of whom 424,900 are the rural residents of Shizhu County. The existing capital of the County is Nanbin Town which will not be involved in the submersion of the water storage of the reservoir region of the Three Gorges Project. Shizhu County is located in the subtropical monsoon zone with the clear seasons. It is warm and wet with enough rain.

Climate

Resources

The forests cover 10.97% of the total area of Shizhu County. There are many precious varieties of trees in the forests, such as metasequoias, tricuspid trees, ormosia firs and ginkgos. There are also more than 50 varieties of trees in the territories of the county for production purposes, such as tung trees and mulberries. In addition, there are more than 170 varieties of wild animals in the forests of the county such as tigers, leopards, otters and wild boars. One can also see more than 10 varieties of edible mushrooms, such as xianggu mushrooms, edible fungus and zhusun mushrooms. In addition, there are various Chinese medical herbs such as Coptis chinensis and Gastrodia elata. Shizhu County is particularly famous for Coptis chinensis and the Chinese people usually call it the home town of Coptis chinensis. More than 20 varieties of ores have been found in Shizhu County, such as coal, natural gas, copper, iron, silver, cadmium, lead, gold and barite.

Three Gorges Reservoir Region

4 townships, 26 villages and 16 fabrication/ ore-mining enterprises have been/ will have been involved in the submersion of the reservoir water storage of the Three Gorges Project. Shizhu County is involved in the submersion of the reservoir water storage of the Three Gorges Project as follows.
· The emigrants living below the water level of the reservoir storage of the Three Gorges Project are 8,400 in Shizhu County;
· The houses/ buildings with the total construction area of 329,700 m² have been/ will have been submerged; 
· 6900 mu citrus and farm land has been/ will have been submerged, representing 4.59% of the total area of citrus and farm land in Shizhu County;
·  highways have been/ will have been submerged;
· The relocation compensation investment is 272 million RMB yuan.

References

External links
The official website of Shizhu Tujia Autonomous County (in Chinese)

 
County-level divisions of Chongqing
Tujia autonomous counties